Calliostoma gubbiolii is a species of sea snail, a marine gastropod mollusk in the family Calliostomatidae.

Description
The size of the shell varies between 15 mm and 24 mm.

Distribution
This marine species occurs in Western European waters; in the Atlantic Ocean off the Canary Islands and from Senegal to Angola.

References

 Gofas, S.; Le Renard, J.; Bouchet, P. (2001). Mollusca, in: Costello, M.J. et al. (Ed.) (2001). European register of marine species: a check-list of the marine species in Europe and a bibliography of guides to their identification. Collection Patrimoines Naturels, 50: pp. 180–213

External links
 

gubbiolii
Gastropods described in 1984